H. Khekiho Zhimomi (19 February 1946 – 26 November 2015) was a politician from Nagaland, India. He was first elected to the Nagaland Legislative Assembly in 1989, then again in 1993 and again in 2003 he was elected to the Legislative Assembly of Nagaland, as the Naga People's Front candidate in the constituency Ghaspani-I (ST), he served as a member of the Rajya Sabha (upper house of the Parliament of India) from 2008 onwards till his death in 2015.

He was first elected to the Nagaland Legislative Assembly in 1989.  He was appointed Cabinet Minister in charge of Industries and Commerce in the Nagaland People's Council Government headed by Chief Minister Vamuzo Phesao in 1990. He was a successful Industrialist of Zhimomi group of industries. He opened the first Pepsi factory in North-East India in 1992 and Nagaland's first packaged drinking water VIVA in 2002.

Zhimomi was married to Khezheli. Together they had six daughters and two sons.

References

Naga People's Front politicians
Rajya Sabha members from Nagaland
1946 births
2015 deaths
Nagaland MLAs 1989–1992
Nagaland MLAs 1993–1998
Nagaland MLAs 2003–2008